Galactosylgalactosylxylosylprotein 3-beta-glucuronosyltransferase 3 is an enzyme that in humans is encoded by the B3GAT3 gene.

The protein encoded by this gene is a member of the glucuronyltransferase gene family, enzymes that exhibit strict acceptor specificity, recognizing nonreducing terminal sugars and their anomeric linkages. This gene product catalyzes the formation of the glycosaminoglycan-protein linkage by way of a glucuronyl transfer reaction in the final step of the biosynthesis of the linkage region of proteoglycans.

References

External links

Further reading